The Santo Antão North Premier Division is a regional championship played in Ribeira Grande and Paul (though not listed), Santo Antão Island, Cape Verde. It is organized by the Santo Antão North Regional Football Association (Associação Regional de Futebol de Zona Norte do Santo Antão, ARFZNSA). The winner of the championship plays in Cape Verdean football Championships of each season.  The league was formed in 1997 and continued to play with the Santo Antão Island League until the breakup into the north and south zones in 2002.

Six clubs participate, a club with the most points participates in the national championships each season while the last placed club from the regional premier division relegates into the second division the following season.

In 2013, the main portion became the Premier Division after the Premier Division was added.

Paulense has the most island titles with six and will total seven on its entirety in late March, second is Solpontense with five, third is Rosariense with three and three clubs Beira-Mar and Foguetões and now Sinagoga with only one title.

Santo Antão North Premier Division- Clubs 2017/18
 Beira Mar - Ribeira Grande
 Foguetões - Eito
 Paulense - Paul
 Rosariense - Ribeira Grande
 Santo Crucifixo - covering the parish, based in Coculi
 Sinagoga

Winners
Source:

Regional championships (1997-2012)
1997/98 : Rosariense Clube
1998/99 : Solpontense
1999/00 : Solpontense
2000-02 : not held as the Santo Antão Island League continued without the two zones
2002/03 : Paulense DC
2003/04 : Paulense DC
2004/05 : Paulense DC
2005/06 : Beira-Mar (Ribeira Grande)
2006/07 : Rosariense Clube
2007/08 : Solpontense
2008/09 : Foguetões
2009/10 : Solpontense
2010/11 : Rosariense Clube
2011/12 : Paulense

Regional Premier Division (since 2013)
2012/13 : Solpontense
2013/14 : Paulense
2014/15 : Paulense
2015/16 : Sinagoga
2016-17: Paulense
2017–18: Os Foguetões

Performance by club

Performance by municipality

Seasons by club
The left indicates the participation in the North Zone and its Premier Division, inside the bracket is overall participation as one island and the North Zone.

See also
Sports in Santo Antão, Cape Verde
Santo Antão North Cup
Santo Antão North Super Cup
Santo Antão North Opening Tournament

References

External links
Santo Antão North Zone Regional Football Association website 
Santo Antão North Premier Division at Sports Midia 

 
Second level football leagues in Cape Verde
1997 establishments in Cape Verde
Sports leagues established in 1997